Have a Laugh! is an American animated comedy series produced by the Walt Disney Company for the Disney Channel. The series is a set of interstitials, presenting edited versions of classic Mickey Mouse cartoons that lasted from 2009 to 2012.

Plot
The series features short and long versions of Disney shorts. The short versions are re-voiced with current Disney voice actors such as Tony Anselmo (Donald Duck), Jim Cummings, Bill Farmer (Goofy), and Bret Iwan (Mickey Mouse). The show features Disney cartoons with the original opening and closing credits restored (if content has been removed, a stamp bearing the words "Short Version" appears on the title card).

The series also features short subjects such as "Disney's Re-Micks" where classic Mickey Mouse cartoons are matched to popular songs such as "He Could Be the One" by Miley Cyrus, similar to the 1980s D-TV series.

List of major characters
 Mickey Mouse (voiced by Bret Iwan)
 Donald Duck, Huey, Dewey, and Louie (voiced by Tony Anselmo)
 Goofy, Pluto (voiced by Bill Farmer)
 Minnie Mouse (voiced by Russi Taylor, and Marcellite Garner)
 Chip, Daisy Duck (voiced by Tress MacNeille)
 Dale, Narrator (voiced by Corey Burton)
 Pete (voiced by Jim Cummings)

List of cartoons

Eighteen cartoons and five redubbed short versions haven't been added online.

BLAM!
 Train (Clips from Mr. Mouse Takes a Trip)
 Sports (Clips from How to Play Football, Double Dribble and How to Play Baseball)
 Skiing (Clips from The Art of Skiing)
 Ice Skating (Clips from The Hockey Champ)
 Skiing 2 (Clips from The Art of Skiing)
 Arctic Adventure (Clips from Polar Trappers)
 Clock Cleaning (Clips from Clock Cleaners)
 Golf (Clips from How to Play Golf and Donald's Golf Game)
 Cooking (Clips from Chef Donald)
 Glider (Clips from Goofy's Glider)
 Fox Hunt (Clips from The Fox Hunt)
 Beach (Clips from Hawaiian Holiday)
 Workout 1 (Clips from Goofy Gymnastics)
 Track And Field 1 (Clips from The Olympic Champ)
 Workout 2 (Clips from Goofy Gymnastics)
 Track And Field 2 (Clips from The Olympic Champ)
 Self-Defense (Clips from The Art Of Self-Defense)
 Snow Fight (Clips from Donald's Snow Fight)
 Hockey (Clips from Hockey Homicide)
 Basketball (Clips from Double Dribble)
 Firefighting (Clips from Fire Chief)

Re-Micks
 The B-52's: "Roam"
 The Beach Boys: "Surfin' Safari"
 The Black Eyed Peas: "I Gotta Feeling"
 deadmau5: "Ghosts 'n' Stuff"
 Far East Movement featuring Ryan Tedder: "Rocketeer"
 Michael Franti & Spearhead: "Say Hey (I Love You)"
 The Go-Go's: "We Got the Beat"
 Andy Grammer: "Keep Your Head Up"
 David Guetta and Kelly Rowland: "When Love Takes Over"
 Hannah Montana: "He Could Be the One"
 Hunter Hayes: "Wanted"
 Jessie J featuring B.o.B: "Price Tag"
 Marky Mark and the Funky Bunch featuring Loleatta Holloway: "Good Vibrations"
 Bruno Mars: "Just the Way You Are"
 Olly Murs: "Dance with Me Tonight"
 Ne-Yo: "Miss Independent"
 Queen: "Another One Bites the Dust"
 Martin Solveig and Dragonette: "Hello"
 Taylor Swift: "Stay Stay Stay"
 Jonas Brothers: "Play My Music" (from Disney Channel's Camp Rock)

Broadcast history
United States
 Disney Channel (2009–2013)
 Disney XD (2009–2013)

United Kingdom
 Disney Channel (2009–2014)
 Disney XD/Disney Cinemagic (2010–2012)
 Channel 5/Fiver (2010–2012)

Ireland
 RTÉ One (2010–2013)
 RTÉ Two (2011–2013)

Canada
 Family Channel (2009–2014)
 Disney Channel (2015–present)

Germany
 Disney Channel (2010–present)
 Disney Cinemagic (2010-2019)

Italy
 Disney Channel (2009–2020)
 Toon Disney (2009–2011)
 Rai Due (2011)

India
 Disney Channel (2011–present)

Indonesia
 RCTI (2014)

Home media
There have been two DVD releases, which include 5 shorts in restored quality, in two versions: one full-length original version, and one edited version. It also includes 3 BLAM! shorts and 1 Re-Micks.

The first two volumes were released on October 26, 2010 in the US and November/December 2010 in the UK.

Volume One:
 Mickey and the Seal
 Lonesome Ghosts
 Winter Storage
 How to Hook Up Your Home Theater
 Food for Feudin
 BLAM! #1 = Sports
 BLAM! #2 = Skiing 1
 BLAM! #3 = Ice Skating
 Re-Micks "Another One Bites the Dust" by Queen

Volume Two:
 Clock Cleaners
 Mr. Mouse Takes a Trip
 The Art of Skiing
 Early to Bed
 Pluto's Sweater
 BLAM! #4 = Skiing 2
 BLAM! #5 = Arctic Adventure
 BLAM! #6 = Clock Cleaning
 Re-Micks – "He Could Be the One" by Hannah Montana

Volumes 3 and 4 were released in the US on June 14, 2011. Volume 3 was later released in other countries, while no confirmation has been made for the UK release of Volume 3, or the international release of Volume 4.

Volume Three:
 Mickey's Delayed Date
 The Whalers
 Chef Donald
 How to Play Baseball
 Pluto and the Gopher
 BLAM! #7 = "Golf"
 BLAM! #8 = "Cooking"
 BLAM! #9 = "Glider"
 Re-Micks – "I Gotta Feeling" by The Black Eyed Peas

Volume Four:
 Mickey Down Under
 Hawaiian Holiday
 Trailer Horn
 How to Swim
 Pluto's Surprise Package
 BLAM! = #10 "Hockey"
 BLAM! = #11 "Beach"
 BLAM! = #12 "Fox Hunt"
 Re-Micks: "Play My Music" by the Jonas Brothers from the film Camp Rock

References

External links
 Mickey Mouse Website on Disney.com
 YouTube Channel

2009 American television series debuts
2012 American television series endings
2000s American animated television series
2010s American animated television series
2000s American anthology television series
2010s American anthology television series
2000s American musical comedy television series
2010s American musical comedy television series
American children's animated anthology television series
American children's animated comedy television series
American children's animated musical television series
American animated television spin-offs
Disney Channel original programming
Donald Duck television series
English-language television shows
Interstitial television shows
Mickey Mouse television series
Television series by Disney